Texas Stagecoach is a 1940 American Western film directed by Joseph H. Lewis and written by Fred Myton. The film stars Charles Starrett, Iris Meredith, Bob Nolan, Dick Curtis, Kenneth MacDonald and Pat Brady. The film was released on May 23, 1940, by Columbia Pictures.

Plot

Cast          
Charles Starrett as Larry Kinkaid
Iris Meredith as Jean Harper
Bob Nolan as Bob Harper
Dick Curtis as Shoshone Larsen
Kenneth MacDonald as John Appleby
Pat Brady as Pat 
Edward LeSaint as Jim Kinkaid
George Becinita as Opache 
Don Beddoe as Tug Wilson
Harry Cording as Clancy

References

External links
 

1940 films
1940s English-language films
American Western (genre) films
1940 Western (genre) films
Columbia Pictures films
Films directed by Joseph H. Lewis
American black-and-white films
1940s American films